The NASR 9000 bomb is a secret Egyptian locally produced fuel air bomb primarily used and manufactured by the Egyptian Air Force since the 1980s. This type of ordinance is commonly referred to as a fuel-air bomb and is believed to have the same destructive power as a nuke. there are different types of this bomb such as the NASR 250 bomb and NASR 1000. The number that the Egyptian Air force possess of this type is unknown and Egypt was not known to possess such type of bomb until it appeared in 2013 in an Egyptian Air force training. not much is known about how many bombs Egypt made or the bombs complete information.

References

Thermobaric weapons
Egyptian Air Force
Weapons of Egypt